This is a list of people who led the military and politics of the Independent State of Croatia.

Military leaders of the Croatian Armed Forces
 pene
 Maks Luburić
 Rafael Boban
 Dinko Šakić
 Božidar Kavran
 Ivan Ico Kirin
 Ivica Matković
 Ljubo Miloš
 Ante Moskov
 Juraj Rukavina
 Tomislav Sertić
 Vjekoslav Servatzy
 Slavko Stanzer
 Vjekoslav Vrančić
 Antun Vrban
 Viktor Pavičić

Political leaders of the NDH

 Ante Pavelić – Poglavnik, President of the Government 1941-1943
 Nikola Mandić – President of the Government 1943-1945
 Osman Kulenović – Vice-president of NDH (1941)
 Džafer Kulenović – Vice-president of NDH (1941-1945), ex-President of Yugoslav Muslim Organization
 Slavko Kvaternik – Vojskovođa (Field-Marshal), Minister of Croatian Home Guard
 Mirko Puk – Minister of Justice
 Andrija Artuković – Minister of the Interior
 Ivan Petrić – Minister of Health (1941–1942)
Left the NDH in 1942 and moved to South America.
 Lovro Šušič – Minister of Economy 1941
 Josip Balen – Minister of Economy 1942-1943
 Vladimir Košak – Minister of Finance 1941-1943
 Ante Filipančić – Minister of Finance 1943
 Dragutin Toth – Minister of Finance 1943-1945
 Mile Budak – Minister of Religion and Education
 Ivica Frković – Minister of Forestry & Mining
 Jozo Dumandžić – Minister of Association
 Milovan Žanić – President of Legislative Committee
 Nahid Kulenović – Son of Džafer Kulenović, high official.

See also
Government of the Independent State of Croatia

References

 
 

Genocide of Serbs in the Independent State of Croatia perpetrators
Collaborators with Fascist Italy
Croatian collaborators with Nazi Germany